Michael "Marcus" Johnson (born December 1, 1981) is a former American football guard. He was drafted by the Minnesota Vikings in the second round of the 2005 NFL draft. He played college football at Mississippi.

Johnson has also been a member of the Oakland Raiders, Tampa Bay Buccaneers and Hartford Colonials. He is the younger brother of CFL offensive lineman Belton Johnson.  Johnson is currently an offensive line coach for the Mississippi State Bulldogs team, 2018 will be his first season in that role.

External links
 Duke Blue Devils football coaching bio

1981 births
Living people
Sportspeople from Greenville, Mississippi
Players of American football from Mississippi
American football offensive tackles
American football offensive guards
Ole Miss Rebels football players
Minnesota Vikings players
Oakland Raiders players
Tampa Bay Buccaneers players
Hartford Colonials players
People from Coffeeville, Mississippi
Duke Blue Devils football coaches